Snow: The Movie is a 1982 Australian comedy directed by Robert Gibson and starring Peter Moon and David Argue. It was filmed at Falls Creek.

References

External links

Snow: The Movie at Oz Movies

Australian comedy films
1982 films
1980s English-language films
1980s Australian films